The Mummers Parade is held each New Year's Day in Philadelphia, and is the oldest continuous folk parade in the United States of America. Local clubs (usually called "New Years Associations" or "New Years Brigades") compete in one of five categories (Comics, Wench Brigades, Fancies, String Bands, and Fancy Brigades). They prepare elaborate costumes, performance routines, and movable scenery, which take months to complete. This is done in clubhousesmany of which are on or near 2nd Street (called "Two Street" by some local residents) in the Pennsport neighborhood of the city's South Philadelphia sectionwhich also serve as social gathering places for members.

Multiple Philadelphia television stations have aired the parade through its history; beginning in 2023 the latest of these is Wilmington, Delaware-licensed WDPN-TV, known as MeTV 2, who will also offer live streamed coverage through the website of its sister station WFMZ-TV in nearby Allentown, Pennsylvania. There have been at least two occasions where the parade was nationally televised, first in 1994 and 1995 by the Travel Channel, then edited coverage on WGN America and WGN-TV in 2009 and 2010.

History

The parade traces back to mid-17th-century roots, blending elements from Swedish, Finnish, Irish, English, German, and other European heritages, as well as African heritage. The parade is related to the Mummers Play tradition from Britain and Ireland. Revivals of this tradition are still celebrated annually in South Gloucestershire, England on Boxing Day along with other locations in England and in parts of Ireland on St. Stephen's Day and also in the Canadian province of Newfoundland and Labrador around Christmas.

Swedes and Finns, the first European colonists in the Philadelphia area, brought the custom of visiting neighbors on "Second Day Christmas" (December 26) with them to Tinicum. This was soon extended through New Year's Day with costumed celebrants loudly parading through the city. They appointed a "speech director", who performed a special dance with a traditional rhyme:

The Mummers derive their name from the Mummers' plays performed in Philadelphia in the 18th century as part of a wide variety of working class street celebrations around Christmas. By the early 19th century, these coalesced with earlier Swedish customs, including the Christmas neighbor visits and possibly shooting firearms on New Year's Day (although this was common in other countries as well) as well as the Pennsylvania German custom of "belsnickling," where adults in disguise questioned children about their behavior during the previous year.

U.S. President George Washington carried on the official custom of New Year's Day calls during the seven years he occupied President's House in Philadelphia. The Mummers continued their traditions of comic verse in exchange for cakes and ale. Small groups of up to twenty mummers, their faces blackened, went door to door, shooting and shouting, and adapting the English Mummer's play by replacing the character of "King George" with that of "General Washington."

Through the 19th century, large groups of disguised (often in blackface) working class young men roamed the streets on New Year's Day, organizing "riotous" processions, firing weapons into the air, demanding free drinks in taverns, and generally challenging middle and upper-class notions of order and decorum.

An 1808 law decreed that "masquerades" and "masquerade halls" were "common nuisances" and that anyone participating would be subject to a fine and imprisonment. It was apparently never successfully enforced and was repealed in 1859. Henry Muhlenberg, writing in 1839, reported, "Men met on the roads in Tinicum and Kingsessing, who were disguised as clowns, shouting at the top of their voices and shooting guns.

Unable to suppress the custom, by the 1880s the city government began to pursue a policy of co-option, requiring participants to join organized groups with designated leaders who had to apply for permits and were responsible for their groups actions. The earliest documented club, the Chain Gang, had formed in 1840 and Golden Crown first marched in 1876 with cross-town rivals Silver Crown forming soon after. By 1881, a local report said "Parties of paraders" made the street "almost like a masked Ball." By 1900, these groups formed part of an organized, city-sanctioned parade with cash prizes for the best performances.
 	
Southern plantation life's contributions include the parade's theme song, James A. Bland's "Oh, Dem Golden Slippers" (introduced in 1903), as well as the 19th-century cakewalk, dubbed the "Mummers' Strut" or the "2 Street Strut".

The first official parade was held January 1, 1901. The first string band, Trilby, was organized in 1898, first paraded in 1902, and last paraded in 2014. In the early years of the official parade, the makeshift costumes of most celebrants were gradually replaced by more elaborate outfits funded by associations' fund-raising efforts.

The official parade has been cancelled only thrice during its history. One happened in 1919 as a result of the Spanish Flu epidemic when many public events were cancelled; another occurred in 1934 due to the effects of the Great Depression and a lack of prize money; and 2021 on grounds of the COVID-19 pandemic.

As they assimilated to Philadelphia, many immigrant groups have joined the tradition. Numerous Irish immigrants and Irish-Americans from South Philadelphia became involved in the Mummers Parade as both Mummers performers and parade goers. Other ethnic groups were soon integrated into the parade through the years. Italian-Americans and Italian immigrants to South Philadelphia began to participate in the Mummers Parade in large numbers after World War II. While South Philadelphia (especially Pennsport) remains one of the most important centers for Mummers traditions and Mummers members, more recent immigrants to the neighborhood from Asia and Latin America generally have fewer ties to the parade and tradition.

While almost all parade participants are currently white, African American mummers existed in the past. The all African American Golden Eagle Club, formed in 1866, had 300 members in the 1906 parade, for example. Judges systematically discriminated against black clubs, however, and the last, the Octavius Catto Club, withdrew after receiving last place in the 1929 parade. The brass bands hired to accompany the Comic Brigades often include black musicians, but do not dress in costume and consider themselves session musicians rather than Mummers.  By 1964, only one African American mummer, Willis Fluelling, remained. As of 2007, a few of the less traditional clubs, such as Spiral Q Puppet Theater's West Philadelphia Mummers Brigade, were integrated.

The comic "wenches" and other female roles in most skits are typically performed by men in drag. Women were not officially allowed in the parade until the 1970s.

Budget problems
As of 2008, the parade cost the city over $1 million each year, including $750,000 for police and parade services and $360,000 in prize money. The 2008 budget crisis led the city to propose closing numerous libraries and firehouses and the scaling back of expenditures for the parade, offering $300,000 for the 2009 parade and nothing for 2010.

After the end of city funding for the parade, the Mummers created the "Save the Mummers Fund" to help cover the additional city fees to paying expenses for police and sanitation services during the event.

Funding for the parade during the first decade of the 2000s was provided for several years by Southwest Airlines, which also took naming rights of the parade, which was called "Southwest Airlines Mummers Parade."  Funding for the 2012 parade was provided by SugarHouse Casino, which renamed the parade to "Sugar House Mummers Parade."

In September 2009, The Bacon Brothers musical duo (comprising Philadelphia natives Michael and Kevin Bacon) recorded a special version of their song "New Year's Day" with members of the All-Star String Band. Proceeds from the sale of the CD went to the Save the Mummers Fund. Additionally, the duo performed a benefit concert for the parade in December 2009.

Location, time, and route
The parade traveled northward on Broad Street in Philadelphia for decades until the 1995 parade when the parade was moved to Market Street due to construction work on Broad Street (notably the "Avenue of the Arts" between Washington Avenue and Philadelphia City Hall). After construction was completed, the parade returned to Broad Street from 1996 to 1999. For various reasons, the parade was moved again to Market Street in 2000. In 2004, the parade was moved back to Broad Street. In 1997, the Fancy Brigades were moved to the Pennsylvania Convention Center, allowing for larger sets, but limiting audience size. In 2011, the Fancy Brigades returned to the parade.

Each year, thousands of people participate in the parade, many wearing elaborate costumes costing tens of thousands of dollars to make and weighing well over 100 pounds. $395,000 in prizes is awarded to the various winners. The costs for making the outfits plus fees to choreographers and prop designers often far exceed the prizes available. While club fund-raisers, hall rentals, and bank loans often cover much of the expense, individual members frequently spend hundreds or thousands of dollars of their own money. To raise funds, many string bands and their members seek paying gigs, particularly in area Fourth of July parades, the annual "Show of Shows" (held in Atlantic City, New Jersey, each winter), weddings, and other events. Many clubs hold "beef and beers" or 50/50 raffles. Most charge annual dues for membership.

As of 2008, the parade began at 9:00 am and ended sometime before 8:00 pm. fancy brigades performed at the nearby convention center at noon and, in a second, judged show, at 5:00 pm. An individual Mummers' struta weaving, comical dance/walk with pumping arms held out to the sidemay last two or three hours from South Philadelphia to City Hall. The whole parade, at close to eleven hours, may have been the longest parade in the U.S. Due to budget cuts, the 2009 parade was shorter, scheduled to begin at 10:00 am and last six and a half hours.

Incidents of foul weather have delayed the parade on occasions by several hours, including 2008.

On January 1, 2015, the Mummers began their parade route at Philadelphia's City Hall and headed south along Broad Street to Washington Avenue. The Mummers used the Benjamin Franklin Parkway as a staging area prior to moving to City Hall to be judged. After the judging, the mummers joined the parade heading south on Broad St. The parade ended at Washington Ave, with some clubs still heading east to Second Street for the unofficial “Two Street Parade”.

If an all-day postponement is required for foul weather, the parade is usually held the following Saturday (or Sunday, if Saturday is inclement), as the expensive and fancy costumes are easily harmed by precipitation or high winds.

Each year, there is a festival leading up to the parade called MummersFest. It allows fans to tour the Pennsylvania Convention Center to watch the Fancy Brigades build their props and practice for their New Year's Day reveal.

Divisions

Comics
Comics are clowns, many of them well-liquored, in colorful outfits, often with multi-level umbrellas who dance to recordings such as "Golden Slippers". The comics typically start the parade. Themes often gently parody current events and traditional life. Prizes are awarded for floats, groups, brigades, couples, original costume, original character, and juvenile.

The comic clubs are:
 Goodtimers 
 Landi
 Rich Porco's Murray Comic Club

Wench Brigades
Wench brigades, an offshoot of comics, pride themselves on continuing traditions such as the dress-and-bloomers "suits", painted faces, decorated umbrellas, and live brass bands to accompany the brigade. 

Wench brigades include: 
 Bryson
 Cara Liom
 Froggy Carr
 O'Malley
 Oregon
 Pirates
 Riverfront
 Saints
 Americans

There are only 9 wench brigades

Fancies
The fancy division is made up of one mother club: 
 Golden Sunrise 

Members with some small floats strut in elaborate costumes to music provided by a live band. Prizes are awarded to individuals, trios, juveniles and captains.

String Bands
String bands provide elaborate performances. Limited to unamplified strings, reeds, and percussion, string bands feature banjos, saxophones (alto, tenor, baritone and bass), accordions, double basses, drums, glockenspiels and occasionally violins in musical arrangements tied to a theme presented by the captain, beautiful costumes and props (some people call them floats). Historically, string bands performed mostly in military-drill formations. Harrowgate (now Uptown) String Band's first-prize-winning railroad tunes with Broadway-style dance in 1976 changed that. String-band performances are now the most elaborate of the parade, outdone only by the fancy brigades indoor performances. These bands come from all over Philadelphia and the surrounding areas.

The participant string bands include the following:

 Aqua
 Avalon 
 Jersey String Band 
 Duffy
 Durning 
 Ferko
 Fralinger 
 Greater Kensington 
 Hegeman
 Pennsport
 Polish American
 Quaker City 
 South Philadelphia 
 Uptown 
 Woodland

Fancy brigades
The largest category with the largest crews, the fancy brigades march the southernmost portion of the parade route, before heading to the convention center for a ticketed show and judging. Until the late 1970s, the fancy brigades were simply larger presentations within the Fancies. As the props grew larger, more cumbersome and more vulnerable to wind, rain and snow, the decision was made to move the Brigades indoors, making them a separate event away from the parade providing the finale to a day of citywide celebrations. These brigades have two shows slated in the center, with the late afternoon show, with the judges present for the scoring of the performances, being televised live.

Fancy brigades include:
 
 Avenuers
 Purple Magic 
 Clevemore 
 Downtowners 
 Golden Crown
 Jokers 
 Satin Slipper
 Saturnalian 
 Spartans 
 Shooting Stars
 South Philly Vikings

2nd Street

Because of the large number of clubhouses there, South 2nd Street (Two Street) often serves as a party location after the parade, with the center of activity being South 2nd Street and Mifflin Street. Local residents and others in the area for the parade crowd the local bars, clubhouses and sidewalks, sometimes joining in the unofficial parade. With the parade they spent months preparing for finished, the Mummers let loose and celebrate. This multi-block party continues well into the night or early morning, with some Mummers not sleeping for twenty-four hours straight.

In 2009, the city declined to pay for any post-parade celebrations on Two Street. However, Rep. Bob Brady helped secure funding for the event in the final hours.

Controversy
The parade has been accused of including hate speech, racist, sexist, anti-LGBT, and culturally insensitive costumes, makeup, and images.

The wearing of blackface carried over from minstrel shows in the early 20th century. Growing dissent from civil-rights groups and the objections of the black community led to most clubs phasing out blackface in the early 1960s.

In 1963, one week before the parade, concerned about their image for a nationwide broadcast, the Mummers banned blackface for the parade. Angry Mummers picketed the parade magistrate's home, leading to a reversal of the decision. Concerned about a possible riot, the city called in extra police for the parade. A 1964 city policy officially banned blackface, but some groups have continued to wear blackface into the 21st century over growing protests. 's parade, the use of blackface is uncommon, but the use of redface and brownface continues, along with other types of racial and ethnic mimicry.

In 1985, South Philadelphia String Band petitioned to use blackface and was denied.

In 1987, mayor Wilson Goode had Mummers photos removed from City Hall because the Mummers appeared to be wearing blackface. Saying the Mummers were not in blackface, a petition resulted in the photos being restored, though not near the mayor's office.

In 1996, half of the string bands reported having female members. The bands' captains, though, made it clear to reporters that they did not want to let women in the bands, but felt they had to, due to declining membership.

In 2003, word spread that Slick Duck Comic Brigade was working on a skit involving priests chasing altar boys. Protests from the Archdiocese of Philadelphia, the Diocese of Camden and the Catholic League, and WPHL-TV announcing they would not air the skit led to the group's cancelling of the skit and claiming it was just a prank.

Goodtimers Comic Brigade's 2003 entry highlighted the Mummers' continued use of blackface, skirting of the rules with brown, red, purple and blue makeup and strong references to minstrel shows. Mummers have declared the alternate color choices as a direct protest of the longstanding and frequently flouted ban. The Goodtimers' stand in for Al Jolson wore dark blue makeup with kinky hair, backed by "a minstrel in blackface on a large poster with 'Gone Yes — Forgotten Never'".

2009's B. Love Strutters Brigade referenced Joey Vento of Geno's Steaks 2008 charges of discrimination filed by the city's Commission on Human Relations. In the skit, "'Aliens of an Illegal Kind,' Arabs had long beards and turbans, Mexicans wore sombreros, and Asian women were depicted as geishas."

In 2013, The Ferko String Band offered "Ferko's Bringing Back the Minstrel Days".

In 2013, Venetian NYA club presented "Indi-sourcing", showing a call center with members dressed as Indians being raided by members dressed as Native Americans and moving the call center to New Jersey.

The 2015 parade again featured blackface, along with a satire of the Black Lives Matter titled "Wench Lives Matter".

In 2016 a group presented a Mexican-themed skit, with all of the performers wearing brownface. Parodies of Black Lives Matter continued.

The same year, Finnegan New Years Brigade presented a Caitlyn Jenner skit showing her pre-transition on the cover of Wheaties box and after transitioning on the cover of a Froot Loops box. A male Mummer, dressed as Jenner, appeared, mocking her Vanity Fair cover announcing she was transgender. News reports showed a Mummer with the Wheaties/Froot Loops sign screaming "fuck the gays!" Social media posts led to two of the Mummers being fired from their day-to-day jobs and ousted from the club.

In 2020, two Mummers were banned from future parades after wearing blackface. In response, mayor Jim Kenney said the city would end the parade "if Mummers leadership does not make immediate changes to better control the parade". City Councilmember Cindy Bass introduced a bill that Mummers who wore blackface risk a $75 fine and a five-year banishment.

See also
Culture of Philadelphia
List of holiday parades

References

Further reading

 (reviewed with excerpt in Chronicle of Higher Education. November 23, 2007 p. B19.)

External links
 Mummers Museum

 
Culture of Philadelphia
1901 establishments in Pennsylvania
Annual events in Pennsylvania
Irish-American culture in Philadelphia
Italian-American culture in Philadelphia
German-American culture in Philadelphia
Parades in the United States
Recurring events established in 1901
Festivals established in 1901
Folk festivals in the United States
New Year's Day